Pokhvistnevo Urban Okrug is an urban okrug in Samara Oblast, Russia. It includes the administrative territorial entities of Pokhvistnevo. The administrative center is Pokhvistnevo.

References

Urban okrugs of Russia